Yevgeny Yuriyevich Dodolyev (also spelled "Yevgeniy" or "Eugueni"; , born 11 June 1957) is a Soviet and Russian journalist, publisher, and one of hosts at a state-owned Russian television channel Russia-1.

Career

Evgeny Dodolev worked in popular Russian newspaper Sovershenno Sekretno (translates as Top Secret in Russian) which was founded by Artyom Borovik and Yulian Semyonov.

He is an owner and publisher of newspaper Novy Vzglyad.

He is the president of the Novy Vzglyad Publishing House and co-owns a few newspapers. The Vice President is Marina Lesko. Co-owner of the Publishing House is Kirsan Ilyumzhinov.

Books
Dodolev published several books, including The Pyramid. The Soviet Mafia (LCCN:	91220622), about the Soviet corruption. He also helped his father Juri Dodolev and his uncle Mikhail Dodolev in writing fiction and historical novels, including The Congress of Vienna in the 19th and 20th centuries.

Films
 Prostitutki (Inside Story goes undercover with the Soviet Police), BBC One 1990, Associate Producer.
 Miss Pressa, Soviet Channel One 1991, Author, Film Editor and Producer.
 If the People Will Lead (The Soviet Media During the Fall of Communism), NBC 1992, Associate Producer.

See also
Sergey Dorenko
Moskovskaya Komsomolka
Moskovskaya Pravda

References

External links
  Publishing House
  Official website of Channel One, Russia
  Official website of the VID television company
  FHM (Russian Edition) Interview, September 2007
 Soviet media and glasnost
 In "new" Russia, editor faces term in prison

1957 births
Living people
Russian journalists
Russian television personalities
Soviet journalists
Russian male journalists
Soviet television presenters
Russian mass media owners
Russian political activists
Russian non-fiction writers
Russian newspaper editors
Russian newspaper founders
Russian media executives
20th-century Russian journalists
21st-century Russian journalists